Tony Sotomayor Carrillo (November 16, 1936 – May 9, 2020) was an American politician and educator.

Carrillo was born in Tucson, Arizona. He received his bachelor's and master's degree from Arizona State University. He served in the Arizona House of Representatives from 1963 to 1969 and was a Democrat. Carrillo received his doctorate degree in education from Wayne State University and then taught at Arizona State University. Carrillo taught at San Jose State University in San Jose, California and was chairman of the educational administration department. Carrillo served on the San Jose East Side Unified High School District Board. Carrillo died in Clovis, California.

Notes

1936 births
2020 deaths
Politicians from Tucson, Arizona
Arizona State University alumni
Wayne State University alumni
San Jose State University faculty
School board members in California
Democratic Party members of the Arizona House of Representatives